The Entry is a 1789 cartoon that depicted George Washington riding a donkey into New York.  It was first distributed during the time of Washington's inauguration as the first president of the United States.  Many accounts say it was "hawked on the streets of the capitol".  No copies of this work have been found since at least 1933.

Background 
On April 14, 1789, Washington received official notification that he had been unanimously selected by the electoral college to be the first president of the United States.  Washington set off from Mount Vernon to the U.S. capital in New York City on the morning of April 16.  Washington passed through Alexandria, Virginia; Georgetown, Maryland (in present-day Washington D.C.); Baltimore; Grays Ferry, Philadelphia; and Trenton, New Jersey, before arriving in New York on April 23.

The first inauguration of George Washington took place on April 30, 1789, on the balcony of Federal Hall in New York City.

Records of the cartoon 
On the seventh of April, John Armstrong, Sr. wrote to Horatio Gates regarding the lavish preparations in New York City, saying

Referring to the same letter, James Parton in Caricature and other comic art in all times and many lands (1877) refers to the couplet above as "one couplet of which was legible", and remarks that "This effort was more ill-natured than brilliant".

In Our Country, also published in 1877, Benson J. Lossing provided the following graphic description of the known couplet within the cartoon:

On 8 March 1896, The New York Times described it as:

Another record of The Entry is found in the two-volume work A history of American graphic humor, 1747-1938 (1933), by English-born American art historian William Murrell and published by the Whitney Museum of American Art.  In the index, he records it as "satire, published in 1789" and provides this description:

One thesis says that it "appeared in early April 1789, probably over or directly after the Palm Sunday weekend."

One modern account describes Humphreys in the cartoon as "laying palm branches" before Washington.

The cartoon in modern times 

In Falwell v. Flynt, 805 F.2d 484, 487 (4th Cir. 1986), Judge Wilkinson wrote:

References 

1789 works
Cultural depictions of George Washington
Individual printed cartoons
American political satire
Caricature
Fictional donkeys